Drake & Josh is an American teen sitcom created by Dan Schneider for Nickelodeon. It aired from January 11, 2004, to September 16, 2007. Two TV films, Drake & Josh Go Hollywood and Merry Christmas, Drake & Josh, were made apart from the regular series that aired on January 6, 2006, and December 5, 2008, respectively. A total of 56 episodes were aired, spanning four seasons. Drake Bell, Josh Peck, and Miranda Cosgrove appeared in all of the episodes.

Series overview

Episodes

Season 1 (2004)

Season 2 (2004)

Season 3 (2005–06)

Season 4 (2006–07)

Films

References 

 
Lists of American sitcom episodes
Lists of American teen comedy television series episodes
Lists of Nickelodeon television series episodes